Galium johnstonii (Johnston's bedstraw) is a plant species in the  Rubiaceae. It is endemic to California, United States, known from four counties: San Bernardino, Los Angeles, Riverside and San Diego. It is dioecious, with male and female flowers on separate plants.

References

External links
Gardening Europe

johnstonii
Endemic flora of California
Mojave Desert
Dioecious plants
Flora without expected TNC conservation status